Kyle Joseph Smith (born January 9, 1992) is an American professional soccer player who plays as a defender for Orlando City in Major League Soccer.

Early life

Personal
Smith was born in Cincinnati, Ohio and attended high school at La Salle.  Kyle played varsity soccer at La Salle for four years and was named to the Greater Catholic League South All League Second Team in 2008 and First Team in 2009. In 2009, he was  named Greater Catholic League South soccer player of the year.

College and youth
Smith played four years of college soccer at Transylvania University between 2010 and 2013, scoring a total of 47 goals during his four years.  As a Junior he set a Transylvania single season record with for both goals and points with 18 and 40 respectively.  As a Senior Smith scored 18 goals with 8 assists earning Heartland Collegiate Athletic Conference Offensive MVP during his final seasons.  He left Transylvania as the team's all-time leading in goals, assists, and points.

After graduation Smith played two seasons with Premier Development League expansion side Cincinnati Dutch Lions in both 2014 and 2015.  In 2015 he was second in the PDL with eleven goals scored over 14 matches.  He left the Dutch Lions as their all time leader in goals, assists, and points with twelve, eight and thirty-two respectively, as well having set their season records in those categories in 2015.

Club career

Louisville City

2016 season
After a successful trial Smith signed his first professional contract with United Soccer League side Louisville City on March 14 and he made his professional debut on March 26 against Charlotte.  He went on to appear in 26 of Louisville's 30 league matches with one goal that he scored on May 6 against Charleston. He also appeared in one of Louisville's two U.S. Open Cup matches as well as all three of Louisville's USL Cup Playoff matches. Although he didn't score in regulation time during any of the USL Cup matches, he converted the first shot of the penalty shoot-out in the Eastern Conference final against New York Red Bulls II. A match that Louisville would go on to lose.  During the season he was named USL mid-season Rookie of the Year.

2017 season
Smith remained with Louisville and made his season debut March 25 against Saint Louis FC.  He appeared in 27 of Louisville's 32 league matches. Missing three matches while suspended for violent conduct and scoring four goals.  He also appeared in one of Louisville's two US Open Cup matches as all four of Louisville's USL Cup Playoff matches. Although he didn't score in regulation time during any of the USL Cup matches, he converted the first shot of the penalty shoot-out in the Eastern Conference final against New York Red Bulls II. Smith and Louisville won the USL Cup Final against Swope Park Rangers, with Smith being named Midseason USL Defender of the Year.

2018 season
Smith had his contract renewed with Louisville and he made his season debut on March 17 against USL expansion side Nashville SC.  He went on to appear in all but one of Louisville's 34 league matches and had more minutes played than any other Louisville player. He scored his first goal of the season on April 14 against Richmond and he went on to score three goals in USL competition.  He also appeared in all five of Louisville's U.S. Open Cup matches scoring one goal as Louisville reached the quarter finals of the competition for the first time in its history.  This included a 3–2 victory over the New England Revolution of MLS; Louisville's first victory over an MLS side.  He also appeared in all four of Louisville's USL Cup playoff matches going goalless.  Smith and Louisville went on to win the USL Cup Final for the second consecutive season.  This time against Phoenix.

Orlando City 
On December 19, 2018, Kyle moved to MLS side Orlando City, reuniting him with head coach James O'Connor who had left Louisville earlier in the year. On March 29, 2021, Smith signed a new two-year deal with Orlando City, keeping him with the club through the end of the 2022 with an option for 2023. On December 5, 2022, Orlando City announced that they had re-signed Smith to a one-year deal for the 2023 season with an option for 2024.

Personal life
Smith graduated from Transylvania University with a degree in accounting and worked as an accountant for the University of Cincinnati College of Medicine after graduation and before signing his first professional soccer contract. He is currently studying for the CPA exam and plans to be an accountant after retiring from soccer.

Club statistics

Honors
Louisville City FC
USL Cup: 2017, 2018

Orlando City
U.S. Open Cup: 2022

References

External links
 
 
 
 Kyle Smith at Louisville City FC

1992 births
Living people
American soccer players
Association football defenders
Cincinnati Dutch Lions players
Louisville City FC players
Major League Soccer players
Orlando City SC players
Soccer players from Cincinnati
Transylvania Pioneers athletes
USL Championship players
USL League Two players